James R. Lupski (born February 22, 1957) is the Cullen Endowed Chair in Molecular Genetics and Professor in the Department of Pediatrics at Baylor College of Medicine. Lupski obtained his BA degree from New York University in 1979 and his PhD and MD degrees in 1984 and 1985, respectively, from the same institution. He later moved for his Residency in Pediatrics to Baylor College of Medicine, where he has stayed since.  Lupski is affected by a genetic disease called Charcot-Marie-Tooth (CMT) and has studied the condition as part of his research. He has contributed to the discovery and definition of genomic disorders and several genetic diseases.

See also 
 Potocki–Lupski syndrome

References

Living people
Baylor College of Medicine physicians and researchers
1957 births
American pediatricians
American geneticists
New York University Grossman School of Medicine alumni
Members of the National Academy of Medicine
Scientists with disabilities